Pathinalaam Raavu is a 1979 Indian Malayalam-language film,  directed by Srini and produced by Salam Karassery. The film stars Nilamboor Shaji, Salam Karassery, Kunjava and P. K. Vikraman Nair. The film has musical score by K. Raghavan.

Cast
Nilambur Shaji
Salam Karassery
Kunjava
P. K. Vikraman Nair
Ravi Menon
Santhakumari
Urmila
Eranholi Moosa

Soundtrack
The music was composed by K. Raghavan with lyrics by Poovachal Khader, Kanesh Punoor and P. T. Abdurahiman.

References

External links
 

1979 films
1970s Malayalam-language films